Mikhail Grigorevich Maltsev (born 12 March 1998) is a Russian professional ice hockey forward for the Colorado Eagles of the American Hockey League (AHL) as a prospect to the Colorado Avalanche of the National Hockey League (NHL). He was selected 102nd overall in the fourth round by the New Jersey Devils in the 2016 NHL Entry Draft. He has previously played for the Devils, and also for SKA Saint Petersburg of the Kontinental Hockey League (KHL).

Playing career

KHL
Maltsev began his career with SKA Saint Petersburg's under-17 team in 2014. Maltsev then played with SKA-1946 of the Junior Hockey League (MHL) and SKA-Neva of the Supreme Hockey League (VHL), both affiliates of SKA Saint Petersburg. In the 2017–18 season, he made his Kontinental Hockey League (KHL) debut with SKA Saint Petersburg, and won the Continental Cup with the team after the regular season.

NHL
Maltsev was selected 102nd overall by the New Jersey Devils in the fourth round of the 2016 NHL Entry Draft. On 13 May 2019, he signed a three-year, entry-level contract with the Devils. Maltsev made his NHL debut on 31 January 2021, in the Devils' 5–3 win over the Buffalo Sabres. On 16 February, Maltsev scored his first NHL goal in the Devils' 5–2 win over the New York Rangers.

On 15 July 2021, Maltsev was traded, along with a second-round pick in the 2021 NHL Entry Draft, to the Colorado Avalanche in exchange for Ryan Graves.

International play
Maltsev played for the Russian national junior team during the 2018 World Junior Ice Hockey Championship.

Career statistics

Regular season and playoffs

International

Awards and achievements

References

External links
 

1998 births
Living people
Binghamton Devils players
Colorado Avalanche players
Colorado Eagles players
New Jersey Devils draft picks
New Jersey Devils players
Russian expatriate ice hockey people
Russian expatriate sportspeople in the United States
Russian ice hockey left wingers
SKA-1946 players
SKA-Neva players
SKA Saint Petersburg players
Ice hockey people from Saint Petersburg